is a manga illustrator and anime character designer. He has done character designs for the anime Kai Doh Maru, Otogi Zoshi, the survival horror video game Galerians: Ash, and the CGI OVA Galerians: Rion, as well as Kill Bill Chapter 3: The Origin of O-Ren. He also provided character designs and artwork for the Final Fantasy VII novel The Kids Are Alright: A Turks Side Story, some of which later appeared in the video game Final Fantasy VII Remake.

Manga works
 Bitch's Life
 Brothers
 Hunter Dark
 Madara
 Multiple Personality Detective Psycho
 Neo Devilman
 Robot: Super Color Comic

External links/References 
 
 The Ultimate Manga Guide - Tajima Shouu
 

1966 births
Manga artists from Saitama Prefecture
Japanese illustrators
Living people

ko:나카하라 유우